Qeshlaq-e Hajji Abish Hajj Rahim (also Romanized as Qeshlāq-e Ḩājjī Ābīsh Ḩājj Raḥīm) is a village in Qeshlaq-e Sharqi Rural District, Qeshlaq Dasht District, Bileh Savar County, Ardabil Province, Iran. At the 2006 census, its population was 27, in 5 families.

References 

Towns and villages in Bileh Savar County